The Distance is a 2006 Spanish boxing-themed neo-noir thriller film directed and written by Iñaki Dorronsoro in his feature film debut. It stars Miguel Ángel Silvestre and Belén López alongside José Coronado, Federico Luppi, and Lluís Homar.

Plot 
The plot tracks the plight of Daniel, a young boxer (and an inmate) experiencing personal guilt for the killing of a man (Salgado) in prison in a hit job. He is subject to the blackmail and overarching control exercised by corrupt homosexual cop Guillermo, refractory to coming out of the closet. Upon leaving prison, Daniel falls romantically for Raquel, Salgado's widow as well as a former hooker, whilst Daniel's boxing coach and a police officer digging on the Salgado case also come into action.

Cast

Production 
The screenplay was penned by Iñaki Dorronsoro. The film was produced by Ábaco Movies, Madrid Sur, and 2Y4 Films, and it had the participation of TVE, and Canal+. It was shot in 2005 in Palencia's former provincial prison, the Campo de la Juventud sports center, as well as several locations in Madrid.

Release 
The film screened in the 'Zabaltegi-New Directors' slate of the 54th San Sebastián International Film Festival on 23 September 2006. Distributed by Filmax, it was theatrically released in Spain on 29 September 2006.

Reception 
Jonathan Holland of Variety deemed the film to be a "polished, well-plotted noir item that provides all the thrills, though it clings too desperately to genre stereotypes".

Mirito Torreiro of Fotogramas rated the film 3 out of 5 stars highlighting the discovery of Miguel Ángel Silvestre and the direction of actors as the best things about the film, while citing the plot playing a bit too much on the viewer's goodwill as a negative point.

Javier Ocaña of El País considered that the film, "skillfully made and with dialogues of a certain level", "is a product as entertaining as it is solvent".

Accolades 

|-
| align = "center" | 2007 || 16th Actors and Actresses Union Awards || Best New Actress || Belén López ||  || 
|}

See also 
 List of Spanish films of 2006

References 

Films shot in the province of Palencia
Films shot in Madrid
2000s Spanish-language films
Spanish crime thriller films
Spanish boxing films
Neo-noir
2006 directorial debut films
2000s Spanish films
Spanish neo-noir films